Dilip Nath (born 19 December 1997) is a Nepalese cricketer. He made his List A debut for Nepal against the United Arab Emirates in the 2015–17 ICC World Cricket League Championship on 6 December 2017. In January 2018, he was named in Nepal's squad for the 2018 ICC World Cricket League Division Two tournament.

In March 2022, he was named in Nepal's Twenty20 International (T20I) squad for the 2021–22 Nepal T20I Tri-Nation Series. He made his T20I debut on 30 March 2022, for Nepal against Malaysia.

References

External links
 

1997 births
Living people
Nepalese cricketers
Nepal Twenty20 International cricketers
Place of birth missing (living people)
People from Dadeldhura District